Morris E. Leeds (March 6, 1869 in Philadelphia – February 8, 1952) was an American electrical engineer known for his many inventions in the field of electrical measuring devices and controls.

Biography 
Leeds was born in Philadelphia in 1869 to Barclay Robert and Mary (Maule) Leeds. After attending the Westtown School, he graduated with a B.S. at Haverford College in 1888. During 1892–93 he was a graduate student in physics at the University of Berlin.

After graduation in 1888 Leeds started working in industry, By 1899 he was cofounded his own firm to manufacture electrical instruments, Morris E. Leed's & Co., where he became managing partner. In 1903 with Edwin Fitch Northrup he founded a second company: Leeds & Northrup to manufacture electrical instruments and pyrometers, where he was president until 1939 and chairman of the board of directors until 1952. He was an active Orthodox Quaker all his life.

Leeds was inducted into the Academy of Natural Sciences and American Academy of Political and Social Science. He received the Edward Longstreth Medal from the Franklin Institute in 1920, the Henry Laurence Gantt Medal in 1936, the ASME Medal in 1946, and the IEEE Edison Medal in 1948.

Patents 

 US Patent No.   965.824 - recorder, 1910.
 US Patent No. 1.057.416 - speed control apparatus, 1913.
 US Patent No. 1.097.651 - measuring apparatus, 1914.
 US Patent No. 1.125.699 - electrical recorder, 1915.
 US Patent No. 1.192.911 - composite resistance, 1916.
 US Patent No. 1.332.182 - automatic control, 1917

References

External links
 Biography

IEEE Edison Medal recipients
1869 births
1952 deaths
ASME Medal recipients